Thomas Folivi Dossevi (born 6 March 1979) is a former professional footballer who played as a striker and winger. He is the manager of Boulogne's U19 squad. Born in France, he recorded 29 caps and two goals for the Togo national team from 2002 to 2012.

Club career

Early career
Dossevi was born in Chambray-lès-Tours, France. He spent his early career at ASOA Valence and Châteauroux and Stade Reims.

Valenciennes
In the summer transfer window, Dossevi joined Valenciennes. Ahead of a new season, L'Équipe reported that Dossevi was on the verge of leaving Valenciennes.

Nantes
In August 2007, Dossevi joined FC Nantes.

Swindon Town
Whilst on trial at the club, he scored twice in Swindon Town's 3–2 win over Nottingham Forest on 31 July 2010. He signed a one-year contract at the club for the 2010–11 season on 3 August 2010, with an option of extending this contract by a further 12 months. His first Football League goal for the club came in a 2–2 draw with Hartlepool United on 14 August 2010. He left Swindon by mutual consent on 26 April 2011, having scored 3 goals in 31 appearances.

Chonburi
Dossevi signed one-year contract with Chonburi on 9 March 2012, the deadline day of Thai Premier League.

International career
Dossevi was a member of the Togo national team, for which he was called up to the 2006 World Cup.

Coaching career
During his time in USL Dunkerque, Dosevvi also worked as a coach for the club. Retiring in the summer 2016, he became a scout at Standard Liège and worked for the club in two years. On 1 October 2019, Dosevvi was appointed manager of US Boulogne's U19 squad.

Personal life
Thomas is the son of former Togolese player Pierre-Antoine Dossevi. He was one of the surviving witnesses of a bus shooting in Angola during the 2010 Africa Cup of Nations.

References

External links

1979 births
Living people
People from Chambray-lès-Tours
Sportspeople from Indre-et-Loire
Citizens of Togo through descent
Togolese footballers
French footballers
Association football forwards
Association football wingers
Togo international footballers
2002 African Cup of Nations players
2010 Africa Cup of Nations players
2006 FIFA World Cup players
Ligue 2 players
Ligue 1 players
English Football League players
ASOA Valence players
LB Châteauroux players
Stade de Reims players
Valenciennes FC players
FC Nantes players
Swindon Town F.C. players
USL Dunkerque players
French sportspeople of Togolese descent
Togolese expatriate footballers
Togolese expatriate sportspeople in England
Expatriate footballers in England
Togolese expatriate sportspeople in Thailand
Expatriate footballers in Thailand
Dossevi family
Footballers from Centre-Val de Loire